The Cypriot identity card is issued to citizens of Cyprus. It can be used as a travel document when visiting countries in Europe (except Belarus, Moldova (old version), Russia, Ukraine and United Kingdom), as well as French overseas territories, Montserrat and Georgia.
This document is not valid in Turkey.

In February 2015 the Republic of Cyprus started issuing biometric identity cards.

In August 2020, new ID cards conforming to new EU standards under Regulation 2019/1157 began to be issued.

Physical appearance 
The colour of the current Cypriot identity card is a light shade of cyan. The coat of arms of Cyprus is situated in the center on both sides of the card. On the top left of the front side, the name of the Republic of Cyprus' is printed in English, Greek (Κυπριακή Δημοκρατία ), and Turkish (Kıbrıs Cumhuriyeti ), and is situated to the right of a smaller grayscale coat of arms. Cards issued according to Regulation 2019/1157 feature the flag of Europe with Cyprus' two-letter country code, CY, printed in negative under the card number. The card is valid for 10 years (5 years for minors under 18) from the time of issue.

Identity information page 
Cypriot identity cards include the following data:

Front
 Photo of Card Holder (1)
 Card Number (1) ?
 Given Names (James) 
 Surname (smith) 

Back
 Sex (4)
 Date of Birth (5)
 Place of Birth (6)
 Nationality (7)
 Father's Name (8)
 Mother's Name (9)
 Mother's Maiden Name (1
 Date of Issue (11)
 Date of Expiry (12)

The acquisition and possession of an identity card is compulsory for any eligible person 12 years old and above.

National Alien's ID Card of Cyprus
The Cypriot Alien's identity card used to be issued to citizens of other EU member states or nationals of third countries, who at the time of application were legal residents of the Republic. It is still practically used in Cyprus for personal identification; however it cannot be used as a travel document. The latest is the main reason the Government of Cyprus stopped issuing such Identity Cards to foreigners in April, 2011 as holders of such IDs were under an impression that as legal residents of a European member country, they could use their IDs to travel within the EU.

Civil Registry and Migration Department announced in 2011 that the Ministry of Interior was at that time looking at introducing a new type of card to replace the troublesome non-national Cyprus ID card. It will be called a residence card and will look similar to an ID card

ID Cards of citizens of North Cyprus

ID Cards of North Cyprus are issued to citizens of self-titled Turkish Republic of North Cyprus, which is recognised only by Republic of Turkey. Citizens of Northern Cyprus are persons granted citizenship by the Government of Northern Cyprus, which was established as a result of occupation of Cyprus by Turkey in 1974, the cause of which had divided the Greek and Turkish communities of the island dating to the year of 1963.

As a result of its unrecognised status by most National Governments, holders of North Cypriot ID Cards or passports do not have the right of free movement. These IDs can be used as travel documents when entering Turkey or the Republic of Cyprus through official check points.

It is important to note that every Turkish Cypriot is entitled to citizenship of Republic of Turkey, however many Turkish Cypriots who are born in Cyprus and can trace their Cypriot and legal residence before the partition can apply and receive a Cypriot passport from the recognised Republic of Cyprus.

See also
 National identity cards in the European Economic Area
Source: http://www.moi.gov.cy/moi/crmd/crmd.nsf/DMLindex_en/DMLindex_en

References

Cyprus